Mirosław Mruk (born 11 February 1962) is a Polish rower. He competed in the men's quadruple sculls event at the 1988 Summer Olympics.

References

1962 births
Living people
Polish male rowers
Olympic rowers of Poland
Rowers at the 1988 Summer Olympics
People from Poznań County